Psychological resilience is the ability to cope mentally or emotionally with a crisis or to return to pre-crisis status quickly. The term was popularized in the 1970s and 1980s by psychologist Emmy E. Werner as she conducted a forty-year-long study of a cohort of Hawaiian children who came from low socioeconomic status backgrounds. Resilience exists when the person uses "mental processes and behaviors in promoting personal assets and protecting self from the potential negative effects of stressors". In simpler terms, psychological resilience exists in people who develop psychological and behavioral capabilities that allow them to remain calm during crises/chaos and to move on from the incident without long-term negative consequences.  A lot of criticism of this topic comes from the fact that it is difficult to measure and test this psychological construct because resiliency can be interpreted in a variety of ways. Most psychological paradigms (biomedical, cognitive-behavioral, sociocultural, etc.) have their own perspective of what resilience looks like, where it comes from, and how it can be developed. Despite numerous definitions of psychological resilience, most of these definitions center around two concepts: adversity and positive adaptation. Many psychologists agree that positive emotions, social support, and hardiness can influence an individual to become more resilient.

Definition

Resilience is generally thought of as a "positive adaptation" after a stressful or adverse situation. When a person is "bombarded by daily stress, it disrupts their internal and external sense of balance, presenting challenges as well as opportunities." However, the routine stressors of daily life can have positive impacts which promote resilience. It is still unknown what the correct level of stress is for each individual. Some people can handle greater amounts of stress than others. A portion of psychologists believe that it is not the stress itself that promotes resilience but rather the individual's perception of their stress and their perceived personal level of control. The presence of stress allows people to practice this process. According to Germain and Gitterman (1996), stress is experienced in an individual's life course at times of difficult life transitions, involving developmental and social change; traumatic life events, including grief and loss; and environmental pressures, encompassing poverty and community violence. Resilience is the integrated adaptation of physical, mental and spiritual aspects in a set of "good or bad" circumstances, a coherent sense of self that is able to maintain normative developmental tasks that occur at various stages of life.
The Children's Institute of the University of Rochester explains that "resilience research is focused on studying those who engage in life with hope and humor despite devastating losses".
It is important to note that resilience is not only about overcoming a deeply stressful situation, but also coming out of the said situation with "competent functioning". Resiliency allows a person to rebound from adversity as a strengthened and more resourceful person. Some characteristics of psychological resilience include: an easy temperament, good self-esteem, planning skills, and a supportive environment inside and outside of the family. Aaron Antonovsky in 1979 stated that when an event is appraised as comprehensible (predictable), manageable (controllable), and somehow meaningful (explainable) a resilient response is more likely.

Process

Psychological resilience is most commonly understood as a process. It is a tool a person can use and it is something that an individual develops overtime. Others assume it to be a trait of the individual, an idea more typically referred to as "resiliency". Most research now shows that resilience is the result of individuals being able to interact with their environments and participate in processes that either promote well-being or protect them against the overwhelming influence of risk factors. This research could be used in support of psychological resilience being a process rather than a trait. Resilience is seen as something to develop. Making it something to pursue and not an endpoint.

Ray Williams (Canadian businessman and author) saw that resilience comes from people able to effectively cope with their environment. He believed that there are three basic ways individuals could react when faced with a difficult situation.

 Respond with anger or aggression
 Become overwhelmed and shut down.
 Feel the emotion about the situation and appropriately handle the emotion.

The third option is the one he believed that truly helps an individual promote wellness. Individuals that follow this pattern are people who show resilience. Their resilience comes from coping with the situation. People who follow the first and second option tend to label themselves as victims of their circumstance or they may blame others for their misfortune. They do not effectively cope with their environment, they become reactive, and they tend to cling to negative emotions. This often makes it difficult to focus on problem solving or bounce back. Those that are more resilient will respond to their conditions by coping, bouncing back, and looking for a solution. Along with continual coping methods, William believed that the resilience process can be aided by good environments. These environments include supportive social environments (such as families, communities, schools) and social policies.

While resilience can be viewed as a developmental process (the process of developing resilience), recent contributions to the literature have started to treat personal resilience as indicated by a response process. In this approach, the effects of an event or stressor on a situationally relevant indicator variable are studied, distinguishing immediate responses from dynamic responses and recovery pattern. This view of 'resilience as process' is rooted in the notion of 'actually bouncing back' as it can be observed from how individuals respond to a stressor and how they subsequently recover. As a first response to a stressor, namely, more resilient people will show some (but less strongly than less resilient individuals) increase in stress. Additionally, the speed with which this response levels off over time (e.g., during next hours or days) to return to pre-stressor or pre-event levels can be seen as indicative of an individual's resilience.

Criticism 

Like other psychological phenomena, by defining specific psychological and affective states in certain ways, controversy over meaning will always ensue. How the term resilience is defined affects research focuses; different or insufficient definitions of resilience will lead to inconsistent research about the same concepts. Research on resilience has become more heterogeneous in its outcomes and measures, convincing some researchers to abandon the term altogether due to it being attributed to all outcomes of research where results were more positive than expected.

There is also some disagreement among researchers in the field as to whether psychological resilience is a character trait or state of being. Psychological resilience has also been referred to as ecological concept, ranging from micro to macro levels of interpretation. However, it is generally agreed upon that resilience is a buildable resource.

Recently there has also been evidence that resilience can indicate a capacity to resist a sharp decline in other harm even though a person temporarily appears to get worse. Similarly, studies have shown that adolescents who have a high level of adaptation (i.e resilience) tend to struggle with dealing with other psychological problems later on in life. This is due to an overload of their stress response systems. There is evidence that the higher one's resilience is, the lower their vulnerability.

History

The first research on resilience was published in 1973. The study used epidemiology, which is the study of disease prevalence, to uncover the risks and the protective factors that now help define resilience. A year later, the same group of researchers created tools to look at systems that support development of resilience.

Emmy Werner was one of the early scientists to use the term resilience in the 1970s. She studied a cohort of children from Kauai, Hawaii. Kauai was quite poor and many of the children in the study grew up with alcoholic or mentally ill parents. Many of the parents were also out of work. Werner noted that of the children who grew up in these detrimental situations, two-thirds exhibited destructive behaviors in their later teen years, such as chronic unemployment, substance abuse, and out-of-wedlock births (in case of teenage girls). However, one-third of these youngsters did not exhibit destructive behaviors. Werner called the latter group resilient. Thus, resilient children and their families were those who, by definition, demonstrated traits that allowed them to be more successful than non-resilient children and families.

Resilience also emerged as a major theoretical and research topic from the studies of children with mothers diagnosed with schizophrenia in the 1980s. In a 1989 study, the results showed that children with a schizophrenic parent may not obtain an appropriate level of comforting caregiving—compared to children with healthy parents—and that such situations often had a detrimental impact on children's development. On the other hand, some children of ill parents thrived well and were competent in academic achievement, and therefore led researchers to make efforts to understand such responses to adversity.

Since the onset of the research on resilience, researchers have been devoted to discovering the protective factors that explain people's adaptation to adverse conditions, such as maltreatment, catastrophic life events, or urban poverty. The focus of empirical work then has been shifted to understand the underlying protective processes. Researchers endeavor to uncover how some factors (e.g. connection to family) may contribute to positive outcomes.

Related factors

Studies show that there are several factors which develop and sustain a person's resilience:

 The ability to make realistic plans and being capable of taking the steps necessary to follow through with them
 Confidence in one's strengths and abilities
 Communication and problem-solving skills
 The ability to manage strong impulses and feelings
 Having good self-esteem 

However, these factors vary among different age groups. For example, these factors among older adults are external connections, grit, independence, self-care, self-acceptance, altruism, hardship experience, health status, and positive perspective on life.

Resilience is negatively correlated with personality traits of neuroticism and negative emotionality, which represents tendencies to see and react to the world as threatening, problematic, and distressing, and to view oneself as vulnerable. Positive correlations stands with personality traits of openness and positive emotionality, that represents tendencies to engage and confront the world with confidence in success and a fair value to self-directedness.

Positive emotions

There is significant research found in scientific literature on the relationship between positive emotions and resilience. Studies show that maintaining positive emotions whilst facing adversity promote flexibility in thinking and problem solving. Positive emotions serve an important function in their ability to help an individual recover from stressful experiences and encounters. That being said, maintaining a positive emotionality aids in counteracting the physiological effects of negative emotions. It also facilitates adaptive coping, builds enduring social resources, and increases personal well-being.

The formation of conscious perception and the monitoring of one's own socioemotional factors is considered a stabile aspect of positive emotions. This is not to say that positive emotions are merely a by-product of resilience, but rather that feeling positive emotions during stressful experiences may have adaptive benefits in the coping process of the individual. Empirical evidence for this prediction arises from research on resilient individuals who have a propensity for coping strategies that concretely elicit positive emotions, such as benefit-finding and cognitive reappraisal, humor, optimism, and goal-directed problem-focused coping. Individuals who tend to approach problems with these methods of coping may strengthen their resistance to stress by allocating more access to these positive emotional resources. Social support from caring adults encouraged resilience among participants by providing them with access to conventional activities.

Positive emotions not only have physical outcomes but also physiological ones. Some physiological outcomes caused by humor include improvements in immune system functioning and increases in levels of salivary immunoglobulin A, a vital system antibody, which serves as the body's first line of defense in respiratory illnesses. Moreover, other health outcomes include faster injury recovery rate and lower readmission rates to hospitals for the elderly, and reductions in a patient's stay in the hospital, among many other benefits. A study was done on positive emotions in trait-resilient individuals and the cardiovascular recovery rate following negative emotions felt by those individuals. The results of the study showed that trait-resilient individuals experiencing positive emotions had an acceleration in the speed in rebounding from cardiovascular activation initially generated by negative emotional arousal, i.e. heart rate and the like.

Forgiveness is also said to play a role in predicting resilience, among patients with chronic pain (but not the severity of the pain).

Social support 
Many studies show that the primary factor for the development of resilience is social support. While many competing definitions of social support exist, most can be thought of as the degree of access to, and use of, strong ties to other individuals who are similar to one's self. Social support requires not only that you have relationships with others, but that these relationships involve the presence of solidarity and trust, intimate communication, and mutual obligation both within and outside the family.

In military studies it has been found that resilience is also dependent on group support: unit cohesion and morale is the best predictor of combat resiliency within a unit or organization. Resilience is highly correlated to peer support and group cohesion. Units with high cohesion tend to experience a lower rate of psychological breakdowns than units with low cohesion and morale. High cohesion and morale enhance adaptive stress reactions. Post-war veterans who had more social support were less likely to develop post-traumatic stress disorder.

Other factors

A study was conducted among high-achieving professionals who seek challenging situations that require resilience. Research has examined 13 high achievers from various professions, all of whom had experienced challenges in the workplace and negative life events over the course of their careers but who had also been recognized for their great achievements in their respective fields. Participants were interviewed about everyday life in the workplace as well as their experiences with resilience and thriving. The study found six main predictors of resilience: positive and proactive personality, experience and learning, sense of control, flexibility and adaptability, balance and perspective, and perceived social support. High achievers were also found to engage in many activities unrelated to their work such as engaging in hobbies, exercising, and organizing meetups with friends and loved ones.

Additional factors are also associated with resilience, like the capacity to make realistic plans, having self-confidence and a positive self image, developing communications skills, and the capacity to manage strong feelings and impulses.

Temperamental and constitutional disposition is considered as a major factor in resilience. It is one of the necessary precursors of resilience along with warmth in family cohesion and accessibility of prosocial support systems. There are three kinds of temperamental systems that play part in resilience, they are the appetitive system, defensive system and attentional system.

Another protective factor is related to moderating the negative effects of environmental hazards or a stressful situation in order to direct vulnerable individuals to optimistic paths, such as external social support. More specifically a 1995 study distinguished three contexts for protective factors:
 personal attributes, including outgoing, bright, and positive self-concepts;
 the family, such as having close bonds with at least one family member or an emotionally stable parent; and
 the community, such as receiving support or counsel from peers.

Furthermore, a study of the elderly in Zurich, Switzerland, illuminated the role humor plays as a coping mechanism to maintain a state of happiness in the face of age-related adversity.

Besides the above distinction on resilience, research has also been devoted to discovering the individual differences in resilience. Self-esteem, ego-control, and ego-resiliency are related to behavioral adaptation. For example, maltreated children who feel good about themselves may process risk situations differently by attributing different reasons to the environments they experience and, thereby, avoid producing negative internalized self-perceptions. Ego-control is "the threshold or operating characteristics of an individual with regard to the expression or containment" of their impulses, feelings, and desires. Ego-resilience refers to "dynamic capacity, to modify his or her model level of ego-control, in either direction, as a function of the demand characteristics of the environmental context"

Maltreated children who experienced some risk factors (e.g., single parenting, limited maternal education, or family unemployment), showed lower ego-resilience and intelligence than nonmaltreated children. Furthermore, maltreated children are more likely than nonmaltreated children to demonstrate disruptive-aggressive, withdraw, and internalized behavior problems. Finally, ego-resiliency, and positive self-esteem were predictors of competent adaptation in the maltreated children.

Demographic information (e.g., gender) and resources (e.g., social support) are also used to predict resilience. Examining people's adaptation after disaster showed women were associated with less likelihood of resilience than men. Also, individuals who were less involved in affinity groups and organisations showed less resilience.

Certain aspects of religions, spirituality, or mindfulness may, hypothetically, promote or hinder certain psychological virtues that increase resilience. Research has not established connection between spirituality and resilience. According to the 4th edition of Psychology of Religion by Hood, et al., the "study of positive psychology is a relatively new development...there has not yet been much direct empirical research looking specifically at the association of religion and ordinary strengths and virtues". In a review of the literature on the relationship between religiosity/spirituality and PTSD, amongst the significant findings, about half of the studies showed a positive relationship and half showed a negative relationship between measures of religiosity/spirituality and resilience. The United States Army has received criticism for promoting spirituality in its new Comprehensive Soldier Fitness program as a way to prevent PTSD, due to the lack of conclusive supporting data.

Biological models

Three notable bases for resilience—self-confidence, self-esteem and self-concept—all have roots in three different nervous systems—respectively, the somatic nervous system, the autonomic nervous system and the central nervous system.

Research indicates that like trauma, resilience is influenced by epigenetic modifications. Increased DNA methylation of the growth factor Gdfn in certain brain regions promotes stress resilience, as does molecular adaptations of the blood brain barrier.

The two primary neurotransmitters responsible for stress buffering within the brain are dopamine and endogenous opioids as evidenced by current research showing that dopamine and opioid antagonists increased stress response in both humans and animals. Primary and secondary rewards reduce negative reactivity of stress in the brain in both humans and animals. The relationship between social support and stress resilience is thought to be mediated by the oxytocin system's impact on the hypothalamic-pituitary-adrenal axis. "Resilience, conceptualized as a positive bio-psychological adaptation, has proven to be a useful theoretical context for understanding variables for predicting long-term health and well-being".

Building resilience

In cognitive behavioral therapy (CBT), building resilience is a matter of mindfully changing basic behaviors and thought patterns. The first step is to change the nature of self-talk. Self-talk is the internal monologue people have that reinforce beliefs about the person's self-efficacy and self-value. To build resilience, the person needs to eliminate negative self-talk, such as "I can't do this" and "I can't handle this", and to replace it with positive self-talk, such as "I can do this" and "I can handle this". This small change in thought patterns helps to reduce psychological stress when a person is faced with a difficult challenge. The second step a person can take to build resilience is to be prepared for challenges, crises, and emergencies. In business, preparedness is created by creating emergency response plans, business continuity plans, and contingency plans. For personal preparedness, the individual can create a financial cushion to help with economic crises, he/she can develop social networks to help him/her through trying personal crises, and he/she can develop emergency response plans for his/her household.

Resilience is also enhanced by developing effective coping skills for stress. Coping skills help the individual to reduce stress levels, so they remain functional. Coping skills include using meditation, exercise, socialization, and self-care practices to maintain a healthy level of stress, but there are many other lists associated with psychological resilience.

The American Psychological Association suggests "10 Ways to Build Resilience", which are:

 to maintain good relationships with close family members, friends and others;
 to avoid seeing crises or stressful events as unbearable problems;
 to accept circumstances that cannot be changed;
 to develop realistic goals and move towards them;
 to take decisive actions in adverse situations;
 to look for opportunities for self-discovery after a struggle with loss;
 to develop self-confidence;
 to keep a long-term perspective and consider the stressful event in a broader context;
 to maintain a hopeful outlook, expecting good things and visualizing what is wished;
 to take care of one's mind and body, exercising regularly, paying attention to one's own needs and feelings.

The Besht model of natural resilience building in an ideal family with positive access and support from family and friends, through parenting illustrates four key markers. They are:

 Realistic upbringing
 Effective risk communications
 Positivity and restructuring of demanding situations
 Building self efficacy and hardiness

In this model, self-efficacy is the belief in one's ability to organize and execute the courses of action required to achieve necessary and desired goals and hardiness is a composite of interrelated attitudes of commitment, control, and challenge.

A number of self-help approaches to resilience-building have been developed, drawing mainly on the theory and practice of CBT and rational emotive behavior therapy (REBT). For example, a group cognitive-behavioral intervention, called the Penn Resiliency Program (PRP), has been shown to foster various aspects of resilience. A meta-analysis of 17 PRP studies showed that the intervention significantly reduces depressive symptoms over time.

The idea of 'resilience building' is debatably at odds with the concept of resilience as a process, since it is used to imply that it is a developable characteristic of oneself. Those who view resilience as a description of doing well despite adversity, view efforts of 'resilience building' as method to encourage resilience. Bibliotherapy, positive tracking of events, and enhancing psychosocial protective factors with positive psychological resources are other methods for resilience building. In this way, increasing an individual's resources to cope with or otherwise address the negative aspects of risk or adversity is promoted, or builds, resilience.

Contrasting research finds that strategies to regulate and control emotions, in order to enhance resilience, allows for better outcomes in the event of mental illness. While initial studies of resilience originated with developmental scientists studying children in high-risk environments, a study on 230 adults diagnosed with depression and anxiety that emphasized emotional regulation, showed that it contributed to resilience in patients. These strategies focused on planning, positively reappraising events, and reducing rumination helped in maintaining a healthy continuity. Patients with improved resilience were found to yield better treatment outcomes than patients with non-resilience focused treatment plans, providing potential information for supporting evidence based psychotherapeutic interventions that may better handle mental disorders by focusing on the aspect of psychological resilience.

Building resilience through language 

As the world globalizes, language learning and communication have proven to be helpful factors in developing resilience in people who travel, study abroad, work internationally, or in those who find themselves as refugees in countries where their home language is not spoken.

Research conducted by the British Council ties a strong relationship between language and resilience in refugees. Their language for resilience research conducted in partnership with institutions and communities from the Middle East, Africa, Europe and the Americas claims that providing adequate English-learning programs and support for Syrian refugees builds resilience not only in the individual, but also in the host community. Their findings reported five main ways through which language builds resilience: home language and literacy development; access to education, training, and employment; learning together and social cohesion; addressing the effects of trauma on learning; and building inclusivity.

The language for resilience research suggests that further development of home language and literacy helps create the foundation for a shared identity. By maintaining the home language, even when displaced, a person not only learns better in school, but enhances the ability to learn other languages. This enhances resilience by providing a shared culture and sense of identity that allows refugees to maintain close relationships to others who share their identity and sets them up to possibly return one day. Thus, identity is not stripped and a sense of belonging persists.

Access to education, training, and employment opportunities allow refugees to establish themselves in their host country and provides more ease when attempting to access information, apply to work or school, or obtain professional documentation. Securing access to education or employment is largely dependent on language competency, and both education and employment provide security and success that enhance resilience and confidence.

Learning together encourages resilience through social cohesion and networks. When refugees engage in language-learning activities with host communities, engagement and communication increases. Both refugee and host community are more likely to celebrate diversity, share their stories, build relationships, engage in the community, and provide each other with support. This creates a sense of belonging with the host communities alongside the sense of belonging established with other members of the refugee community through home language.

Additionally, language programs and language learning can help address the effects of trauma by providing a means to discuss and understand. Refugees are more capable of expressing their trauma, including the effects of loss, when they can effectively communicate with their host community. Especially in schools, language learning establishes safe spaces through storytelling, which further reinforces comfort with a new language, and can in turn lead to increased resilience.

The fifth way, building inclusivity, is more focused on providing resources. By providing institutions or schools with more language-based learning and cultural material, the host community can better learn how to best address the needs of the refugee community. This overall addressing of needs feeds back into the increased resilience of refugees by creating a sense of belonging and community.

Additionally, a study completed by Kate Nguyen, Nile Stanley, Laurel Stanley, and Yonghui Wang shows the impacts of storytelling in building resilience. This aligns with many of the five factors identified by the study completed by the British Council, as it emphasizes the importance of sharing traumatic experiences through language. This study in particular showed that those who were exposed to more stories, from family or friends, had a more holistic view of life's struggles, and were thus more resilient, especially when surrounded by foreign languages or attempting to learn a new language.

Other development programs

The Head Start program was shown to promote resilience. So was the Big Brothers Big Sisters Programme, Centered Coaching & Consulting, the Abecedarian Early Intervention Project, and social programs for youth with emotional or behavioral difficulties. 

The Positive Behavior Supports and Intervention program is a successful trauma-informed, resilience-based for elementary age students with four components. These four elements include positive reinforcements such as encouraging feedback, understanding that behavior is a response to unmet needs or a survival response, promoting belonging, mastery and independence, and finally, creating an environment to support the student through sensory tools, mental health breaks and play.

Tuesday's Children, a family service organization that made a long-term commitment to the individuals that have lost loved ones to 9/11 and terrorism around the world, works to build psychological resilience through programs such as Mentoring and Project COMMON BOND, an 8-day peace-building and leadership initiative for teens, ages 15–20, from around the world who have been directly impacted by terrorism.

Military organizations test personnel for the ability to function under stressful circumstances by deliberately subjecting them to stress during training. Those students who do not exhibit the necessary resilience can be screened out of the training. Those who remain can be given stress inoculation training. The process is repeated as personnel apply for increasingly demanding positions, such as special forces.

Children

Resilience in children refers to individuals who are doing better than expected, given a history that includes risk or adverse experience. Once again, it is not a trait or something that some children simply possess. There is no such thing as an 'invulnerable child' that can overcome any obstacle or adversity that he or she encounters in life—and in fact, the trait is quite common. All children share the uniqueness of an upbringing, experiences which could be positive or negative. Adverse Childhood Experiences (ACE's) are events which occur in a child's life that could lead to maladaptive symptoms such as feeling tension, low mood, repetitive and recurring thoughts, and avoidance. The psychological resilience to overcome adverse events is not the sole explanation of why some children experience post-traumatic growth and some do not. Resilience is the product of a number of developmental processes over time, that has allowed children experience small exposures to adversity or some sort of age appropriate challenges to develop mastery and continue to develop competently. This gives children a sense of personal pride and self-worth.

Research on 'protective factors', which are characteristics of children or situations that particularly help children in the context of risk has helped developmental scientists to understand what matters most for resilient children. Two of these that have emerged repeatedly in studies of resilient children are good cognitive functioning (like cognitive self-regulation and IQ) and positive relationships (especially with competent adults, like parents). Children who have protective factors in their lives tend to do better in some risky contexts when compared to children without protective factors in the same contexts. However, this is not a justification to expose any child to risk. Children do better when not exposed to high levels of risk or adversity.

Building in the classroom

Resilient children within classroom environments have been described as working and playing well and holding high expectations, have often been characterized using constructs such as locus of control, self-esteem, self-efficacy, and autonomy. All of these things work together to prevent the debilitating behaviors that are associated with learned helplessness.

Role of the community

Communities play a huge role in fostering resilience. The clearest sign of a cohesive and supportive community is the presence of social organizations that provide healthy human development. Services are unlikely to be used unless there is good communication concerning them. Children who are repeatedly relocated do not benefit from these resources, as their opportunities for resilience-building, meaningful community participation are removed with every relocation.

Role of the family

Fostering resilience in children is favored in family environments that are caring and stable, hold high expectations for children's behavior and encourage participation in the life of the family. Most resilient children have a strong relationship with at least one adult, not always a parent, and this relationship helps to diminish risk associated with family discord. The definition of parental resilience, as the capacity of parents to deliver a competent and quality level of parenting to children, despite the presence of risk factors, has proven to be a very important role in children's resilience. Understanding the characteristics of quality parenting is critical to the idea of parental resilience. Even if divorce produces stress, the availability of social support from family and community can reduce this stress and yield positive outcomes. Any family that emphasizes the value of assigned chores, caring for brothers or sisters, and the contribution of part-time work in supporting the family helps to foster resilience. Resilience research has traditionally focused on the well-being of children, with limited academic attention paid to factors that may contribute to the resilience of parents.

Families in poverty

Numerous studies have shown that some practices that poor parents utilize help promote resilience within families. These include frequent displays of warmth, affection, emotional support; reasonable expectations for children combined with straightforward, not overly harsh discipline; family routines and celebrations; and the maintenance of common values regarding money and leisure. According to sociologist Christopher B. Doob, "Poor children growing up in resilient families have received significant support for doing well as they enter the social world—starting in daycare programs and then in schooling."

Bullying

Beyond preventing bullying, it is also important to consider how interventions based on emotional intelligence are important in the case that bullying does occur. Increasing emotional intelligence may be an important step in trying to foster resilience among victims. When a person faces stress and adversity, especially of a repetitive nature, their ability to adapt is an important factor in whether they have a more positive or negative outcome.

A 2013 study examined adolescents who illustrated resilience to bullying and found some interesting gendered differences, with higher behavioral resilience found among girls and higher emotional resilience found among boys. Despite these differences, they still implicated internal resources and negative emotionality in either encouraging or being negatively associated with resilience to bullying respectively and urged for the targeting of psychosocial skills as a form of intervention. Emotional intelligence has been illustrated to promote resilience to stress and as mentioned previously, the ability to manage stress and other negative emotions can be preventative of a victim going on to perpetuate aggression. One factor that is important in resilience is the regulation of one's own emotions. Schneider et al. (2013) found that emotional perception was significant in facilitating lower negative emotionality during stress and Emotional Understanding facilitated resilience and has a positive correlation with positive affect.

Education

Many years and sources of research indicate that there are a few consistent protective factors of young children despite differences in culture and stressors (poverty, war, divorce of parents, natural disasters, etc.):
 Capable parenting
 Other close relationships
 Intelligence
 Self-control
 Motivation to succeed
 Self-confidence & self-efficacy
 Faith, hope, belief life has meaning
 Effective schools
 Effective communities
 Effective cultural practices

Ann Masten coins these protective factors as "ordinary magic," the ordinary human adaptive systems that are shaped by biological and cultural evolution. In her book, Ordinary Magic: Resilience in Development, she discusses the "immigrant paradox", the phenomenon that first-generation immigrant youth are more resilient than their children. Researchers hypothesize that "there may be culturally based resiliency that is lost with succeeding generations as they become distanced from their culture of origin." Another hypothesis is that those who choose to immigrate are more likely to be more resilient.

Research by Rosemary Gonzalez and Amado M. Padilla on the academic resilience of Mexican–American high school students reveal that while a sense of belonging to school is the only significant predictor of academic resilience, a sense of belonging to family, a peer group, and a culture can also indicate higher academic resilience. "Although cultural loyalty overall was not a significant predictor of resilience, certain cultural influences nonetheless contribute to resilient outcomes, like familism and cultural pride and awareness." The results of Gonzalez and Padilla's study "indicate a negative relationship between cultural pride and the ethnic homogeneity of a school." They hypothesize that "ethnicity becomes a salient and important characteristic in more ethnically diverse settings".

Considering the implications of the research by Masten, Gonzalez, and Padilla, a strong connection with one's cultural identity is an important protective factor against stress and is indicative of increased resilience. While many additional classroom resources have been created to promote resilience in developing students, the most effective ways to ensure resilience in children is by protecting their natural adaptive systems from breaking down or being hijacked. At home, resilience can be promoted through a positive home environment and emphasized cultural practices and values. In school, this can be done by ensuring that each student develops and maintains a sense of belonging to the school through positive relationships with classroom peers and a caring teacher. Research on resilience consistently shows that a sense of belonging—whether it be in a culture, family, or another group—greatly predicts resiliency against any given stressor.

Specific situations

Divorce

Often divorce is viewed as detrimental to one's emotional health, but studies have shown that cultivating resilience may be beneficial to all parties involved. The level of resilience a child will experience after their parents have split is dependent on both internal and external variables. Some of these variables include their psychological and physical state and the level of support they receive from their schools, friends, and family friends. The ability to deal with these situations also stems from the child's age, gender, and temperament. Children will experience divorce differently and thus their ability to cope with divorce will differ too. About 20–25% of children will "demonstrate severe emotional and behavioral problems" when going through a divorce. This percentage is notably higher than the 10% of children exhibiting similar problems in married families. Despite this, approximately 75–80% of these children will "develop into well-adjusted adults with no lasting psychological or behavioral problems". This comes to show that most children have the tools necessary to allow them to exhibit the resilience needed to overcome their parents' divorce.

The effects of the divorce extend past the separation of both parents. The remaining conflict between parents, financial problems, and the re-partnering or remarriage of parents can cause lasting stress. Studies conducted by Booth and Amato (2001) have shown that there is no correlation between post-divorce conflict and the child's ability to adjust to their life circumstance. On the other hand, Hetherington (1999) completed research on this same topic and did find adverse effects in children. In regards to the financial standing of a family, divorce does have the potential to reduce the children's style of living. Child support is often given to help cover basic needs such as schooling. If the parents' finances are already scarce then their children may not be able to participate in extracurricular activities such as sports and music lessons, which can be detrimental to their social lives.

Repartnering or remarrying can bring in additional levels of conflict and anger into their home environment. One of the reasons that re-partnering causes additional stress is because of the lack of clarity in roles and relationships; the child may not know how to react and behave with this new "parent" figure in their life. In most cases, bringing in a new partner/spouse will be the most stressful when done shortly after the divorce. In the past, divorce had been viewed as a "single event", but now research shows that divorce encompasses multiple changes and challenges. It is not only internal factors that allow for resiliency, but the external factors in the environment are critical for responding to the situation and adapting. Certain programs such as the 14-week Children's Support Group and the Children of Divorce Intervention Program may help a child cope with the changes that occur from a divorce.

Natural disasters

Resilience after a natural disaster can be gauged in a number of different ways. It can be gauged on an individual level, a community level, and on a physical level. The first level, the individual level, can be defined as each independent person in the community. The second level, the community level, can be defined as all those inhabiting the locality affected. Lastly, the physical level can be defined as the infrastructure of the locality affected.

UNESCAP funded research on how communities show resiliency in the wake of natural disasters. They found that, physically, communities were more resilient if they banded together and made resiliency an effort of the whole community. Social support is key in resilient behavior, and especially the ability to pool resources. In pooling social, natural, and economic resources, they found that communities were more resilient and able to over come disasters much faster than communities with an individualistic mindset.

The World Economic Forum met in 2014 to discuss resiliency after natural disasters. They conclude that countries that are more economically sound, and have more individuals with the ability to diversify their livelihoods, will show higher levels of resiliency. This has not been studied in depth yet, but the ideas brought about through this forum appear to be fairly consistent with already existing research.

Research indicates that resilience following natural disasters can be predicted by the level of emotion an individual experienced and were able to process within and following the disaster. Those who employ emotional styles of coping were able to grow from their experiences and then help others. In these instances, experiencing emotions was adaptive. Those who did not engage with their emotions and employed avoidant and suppressive coping styles had poorer mental health outcomes following disaster.

Death of a family member

Little research has been done on the topic of family resilience in the wake of the death of a family member. Traditionally, clinical attention to bereavement has focused on the individual mourning process rather than on those of the family unit as a whole. Resiliency is distinguished from recovery as the "ability to maintain a stable equilibrium" which is conducive to balance, harmony, and recovery. Families must learn to manage familial distortions caused by the death of the family member, which can be done by reorganizing relationships and changing patterns of functioning to adapt to their new situation. Exhibiting resilience in the wake of trauma can successfully traverse the bereavement process without long-term negative consequences.

One of the healthiest behaviors displayed by resilient families in the wake of a death is honest and open communication. This facilitates an understanding of the crisis. Sharing the experience of the death can promote immediate and long-term adaptation to the recent loss of a loved one. Empathy is a crucial component in resilience because it allows mourners to understand other positions, tolerate conflict, and be ready to grapple with differences that may arise. Another crucial component to resilience is the maintenance of a routine that helps to bind the family together through regular contact and order. The continuation of education and a connection with peers and teachers at school is an important support for children struggling with the death of a family member.

Professional settings 

Resilience has also been examined in the context of failure and setbacks in workplace settings. Representing one of the core constructs of positive organizational behavior (Luthans, 2002), and given increasingly disruptive and demanding work environments, scholars' and practitioners' attention to psychological resilience in organizations has greatly increased. This research has highlighted certain personality traits, personal resources (e.g., self-efficacy, work-life balance, social competencies), personal attitudes (e.g., sense of purpose, job commitment), positive emotions, and work resources (e.g., social support, positive organizational context) as potential facilitators of workplace resilience.

Beyond studies on general workplace resilience, attention has been directed to the role of resilience in innovative contexts. Due to high degrees of uncertainty and complexity in the innovation process, failure and setbacks are naturally happening frequently in this context. As such failure and setbacks can have strong and harmful effects on affected individuals' motivation and willingness to take risks, their resilience is essential to productively engage in future innovative activities. To account for the peculiarities of the innovation context, a resilience construct specifically aligned to this unique context was needed to address the need to diagnose and develop innovators' resilience to minimize the human cost of failure and setbacks in innovation. As a context-specific conceptualization of resilience, Innovator Resilience Potential (IRP) serves this purpose and captures the potential for innovative functioning after the experience of failure or setbacks in the innovation process and for handling future setbacks. Based on Bandura's social cognitive theory, IRP is proposed to consist of six components: self-efficacy, outcome expectancy, optimism, hope, self-esteem, and risk propensity. The concept of IRP thus reflects a process perspective on resilience. On the one hand, in this process, IRP can be seen as an antecedent of how a setback affects an innovator. On the other hand, IRP can be seen as an outcome of the process that, in turn, is influenced by the setback situation. Recently, a measurement scale of IRP was developed and validated.

Cross-cultural resilience

Areas of difference 
There is controversy about the indicators of good psychological and social development when resilience is studied across different cultures and contexts. The American Psychological Association's Task Force on Resilience and Strength in Black Children and Adolescents, for example, notes that there may be special skills that these young people and families have that help them cope, including the ability to resist racial prejudice. Researchers of indigenous health have shown the impact of culture, history, community values, and geographical settings on resilience in indigenous communities. People who cope may also show "hidden resilience" when they do not conform with society's expectations for how someone is supposed to behave (in some contexts, aggression may be required to cope, or less emotional engagement may be protective in situations of abuse).

Resilience in individualist and collectivist communities

Individualist cultures, such as those of the U.S., Austria, Spain, and Canada, emphasize personal goals, initiatives, and achievements. Independence, self-reliance, and individual rights are highly valued by members of individualistic cultures. Economic, political, and social policies reflect the culture's interest in individualism. The ideal person in individualist societies is assertive, strong, and innovative. People in this culture tend to describe themselves in terms of their unique traits- "I am analytical and curious" (Ma et al. 2004). Comparatively, in places like Japan, Sweden, Turkey, and Guatemala, Collectivist cultures emphasize family and group work goals. The rules of these societies promote unity, brotherhood, and selflessness. Families and communities practice cohesion and cooperation. The ideal person in collectivist societies is trustworthy, honest, sensitive, and generous- emphasizing intrapersonal skills. Collectivists tend to describe themselves in terms of their roles- "I am a good husband and a loyal friend" (Ma et al. 2004) In a study on the consequences of disaster on a culture's individualism, researchers operationalized these cultures by identifying indicative phrases in a society's literature. Words that showed the theme of individualism include, "able, achieve, differ, own, personal, prefer, and special." Words that indicated collectivism include, "belong, duty, give, harmony, obey, share, together."

Differences in response to natural disasters

Natural disasters threaten to destroy communities, displace families, degrade cultural integrity, and diminish an individual's level of functioning. Comparing individualist community reactions to collectivist community responses after natural disasters illustrates their differences and respective strengths as tools of resilience.
Some suggest that disasters reduce individual agency and sense of autonomy as it strengthens the need to rely on other people and social structures. Therefore, countries/regions with heightened exposure to disaster should cultivate collectivism. However, Withey (1962) and Wachtel (1968) conducted interviews and experiments on disaster survivors which indicated that disaster-induced anxiety and stress decrease one's focus on social-contextual information – a key component of collectivism. In this way, disasters may lead to increased individualism.

Mauch and Pfister (2004) questioned the association between socio-ecological indicators and cultural-level change in individualism. In their research, for each socio-ecological indicator, frequency of disasters was associated with greater (rather than less) individualism. Supplementary analyses indicated that the frequency of disasters was more strongly correlated with individualism-related shifts than was the magnitude of disasters or the frequency of disasters qualified by the number of deaths. Baby-naming practices is one interesting indicator of change. According to Mauch and Pfister (2004), urbanization was linked to preference for uniqueness in baby-naming practices at a 1-year lag, secularism was linked to individualist shifts in interpersonal structure at both lags, and disaster prevalence was linked to more unique naming practices at both lags. Secularism and disaster prevalence contributed mainly to shifts in naming practices.

There is a gap in disaster recovery research that focuses on psychology and social systems but does not adequately address interpersonal networking or relationship formation and maintenance. A disaster response theory holds that individuals who use existing communication networks fare better during and after disasters. Moreover, they can play important roles in disaster recovery by taking initiative to organize and help others recognize and use existing communication networks and coordinate with institutions which correspondingly should strengthen relationships with individuals during normal times so that feelings of trust exist during stressful ones.

In a collectivist sense, building strong, self-reliant communities, whose members know each other, know each other's needs and are aware of existing communication networks, looks like an optimum defense against disasters.

In comparing these cultures, there is really no way to measure resilience, but one can look at the collateral consequences of a disaster to a country to gauge its resilience.

Collectivist resilience

 returning to routine
 rebuilding family structures
 communal sharing of resources
 emotional expression of grief and loss to a supportive listener
 finding benefits from the disaster experience

Individualist resilience:

 redistribution of power/resources
 returning to routine
 emotional expression through formal support systems
 confrontation of the problem
 reshaping one's outlook after the disaster experience

Whereas individualistic societies promote individual responsibility for self-sufficiency, the collectivistic culture defines self-sufficiency within an interdependent communal context (Kayser et al. 2008). Even where individualism is salient, a group thrives when its members choose social over personal goals and seek to maintain harmony and where they value collectivist over individualist behavior (McAuliffe et al. 2003).

The concept of resilience in language

While not all languages have a direct translation for the English word "resilience", nearly every culture and community globally has a word which relates to a similar concept.The differences between the literal meanings of translated words shows that there is a common understanding of what resilience is. Even if a word does not directly translate to "resilience" in English, it relays a meaning similar enough to the concept and is used as such within the language.

If a specific word for resilience does not exist in a language, speakers of that language typically assign a similar word that insinuates resilience based on context. Many languages use words that translate to "elasticity" or "bounce", which are used in context to capture the meaning of resilience. For example, one of the main words for "resilience" in Chinese literally translates to "rebound", one of the main words for "resilience" in Greek translates to "bounce", and one of the main words for "resilience" in Russian translates to "elasticity," just as it does in German. However, this is not the case for all languages. For example, if a Spanish speaker wanted to say "resilience", their main two options translate to "resistance" and "defense against adversity". Many languages have words that translate better to "tenacity" or "grit" better than they do to "resilience". While these languages may not have a word that exactly translates to "resilience", note that English speakers often use tenacity or grit when referring to resilience. While one of the Greek words for "resilience" translates to "bounce", another option translates to "cheerfulness". Moreover, Arabic has a word solely for resilience, but also two other common expressions to relay the concept, which directly translate to "capacity on deflation" or "reactivity of the body", but are better translated as "impact strength" and "resilience of the body" respectively. On the other hand, a few languages, such as Finnish, have created words to express resilience in a way that cannot be translated back to English. In Finnish, the word "sisu" could most closely be translated to mean "grit" in English, but blends the concepts of resilience, tenacity, determination, perseverance, and courage into one word that has even become a facet of Finnish culture and earned its place as a name for a few Finnish brands.

Criticism of application

Brad Evans and Julian Reid criticize resilience discourse and its rising popularity in their book, Resilient Life. The authors assert that policies of resilience can put the onus of disaster response on individuals rather than publicly coordinated efforts. Tied to the emergence of neoliberalism, climate change, third-world development, and other discourses, Evans and Reid argue that promoting resilience draws attention away from governmental responsibility and towards self-responsibility and healthy psychological effects such as post-traumatic growth.

See also

References

Further reading

 Benard, B. (2004). Resiliency: What we have learned. San Francisco: WestEd.
 Bronfenbrenner, U. (1979). Ecology of human development. Cambridge MA: Harvard University Press.
 Comoretto, A., Crichton, N., & Albery, I.P. (2011). Resilience in humanitarian aid workers: understanding processes of development. LAP: Lambert Academic Publishing.* Gonzales, Laurence (2012). Surviving Survival: The Art and Science of Resilience. New York: W.W. Norton & Company.
 * 
 Masten, A.S. (1999). "Resilience comes of age: Reflections on the past and outlook for the next generation of research". In M.D. Glantz & J.L. Johnson (Eds.), Resilience and development: Positive life adaptations (pp. 281–296). New York: Kluwer Academic/Plenum Press.
 Reivich, Karen, and Shatte, Andrew (2002). The Resilience Factor: 7 Keys to Finding Your Inner Strength and Overcoming Life's Hurdles. New York: Broadway.
 Rutter, M. (2000). "Resilience reconsidered: Conceptual considerations, empirical findings, and policy implications". In J.P. Shonkoff & S.J. Meisels (Eds.), Handbook of early childhood intervention (2nd ed., pp. 651–682). New York: Cambridge University Press.
 
 Southwick, Steven M., and Charnie, Dennis S. (2018). Resilience: The Science of Mastering Life's Greatest Challenges (Second edition). Cambridge: Cambridge University Press. .
 Ungar, M. (2007). "Contextual and cultural aspects of resilience in child welfare settings". In I. Brown, F. Chaze, D. Fuchs, J. lafrance, S. McKay & S. Thomas-Prokop (Eds.), Putting a human face on child welfare (pp. 1–24). Toronto: Centre of Excellence for Child Welfare.

External links

 National Resilience Resource Center
 Research on resilience at Dalhousie University
 What is psychological resilience? – Wilderdom
 Penn Resiliency Program – Lessons Plans

Life skills
Motivation
Psychological adjustment
Resilience
Self-sustainability